The 2021 Munster Senior Hurling Championship was the 134th staging of the Munster Senior Hurling Championship since its establishment by the Gaelic Athletic Association in 1888. 

Limerick were the twice-defending Munster champions. They won the title for the 3rd year in succession, defeating Tipperary in the final.

Teams
The Munster championship was contested by five of the six counties from the Irish province of Munster. The exception was Kerry, traditionally the province's weakest at hurling (but strongest in football).

Bracket

Quarter-finals

Semi-finals

Final

See also
 2021 All-Ireland Senior Hurling Championship
 2021 Leinster Senior Hurling Championship
 2021 Joe McDonagh Cup

References

Munster
Munster Senior Hurling Championship